Pic de la Pala Alta de Sarradé is a mountain of the Pyrenees, Catalonia, Spain. Located in the Aigüestortes i Estany de Sant Maurici National Park, it has an elevation of 2,983 metres above sea level).

See also
Aigüestortes i Estany de Sant Maurici National Park

References

Mountains of Catalonia
Mountains of the Pyrenees